Gerard Alfons Kusz (23 October 1939 – 15 March 2021) was a Polish Roman Catholic prelate. He was auxiliary bishop of Opole (1985–1992) and Gliwice (1992–2014).

He was also Titular Bishop of Tagarbala from 1985 to his death.

References

20th-century Roman Catholic bishops in Poland
21st-century Roman Catholic bishops in Poland
1939 births
2021 deaths